The Land letter was a letter sent to U.S. President George W. Bush by five evangelical Christian leaders on October 3, 2002, outlining their support for a just war pre-emptive invasion of Iraq.  As its foundation for support, the letter refers to the "criteria of just war theory as developed by Christian theologians in the late fourth and early fifth centuries A.D." The letter was written by Richard D. Land, president of the Ethics & Religious Liberty Commission of the Southern Baptist Convention.  It was co-signed by:

 Chuck Colson, founder of Prison Fellowship Ministries
 Bill Bright, chairman of the Christian organization Cru
 James Kennedy, president of Coral Ridge Ministries, and
 Carl D. Herbster, president of the American Association of Christian Schools

The letter asserted that a pre-emptive invasion of Iraq met the criteria of traditional 'just war' theory because:
 such an action would be defensive
 the intent is found to be just and noble.  The United States does not intend to 'destroy, conquer, or exploit Iraq'
 it is a last resort because Saddam Hussein had a record of attacking his neighbors, of the 'headlong pursuit and development of biochemical and nuclear weapons of mass destruction' and their use against his own people, and harboring Al-Qaeda in Iraq terrorists
 it is authorized by a legitimate authority, namely the United States
 it has limited goals
 it has reasonable expectation of success
 non-combatant immunity would be observed
 it meets the criteria of proportionality—the human cost on both sides would be justified by the intended outcome

See also
Religious opposition to the Iraq War

References

External links
 Text of the Land letter

Causes and prelude of the Iraq War
Stances and opinions regarding the Iraq War
Christianity and violence
Evangelical documents
2002 documents